Walpole Island is an island and First Nation reserve in southwestern Ontario, Canada, on the border between Ontario and Michigan in the United States.

It is unceded territory and is inhabited by the Ojibwe, Potawatomi, and Odawa peoples of the Walpole Island First Nation, who call it Bkejwanong, meaning "where the waters divide" in Anishinaabemowin. In addition to Walpole Island, the reserve includes Squirrel Island, St. Anne Island, Seaway Island (except a small U.S. portion), Bassett Island, and Potawatomi Island. The river or creeks that separate these islands provide the area with its other commonly used name, 
Swejwanong or "many forks of a river."

It is independent of, but within the geographic region of, Lambton County and adjoins the municipality of Chatham-Kent and the township of St. Clair. Across the St. Clair River to the west are the United States towns of Algonac, Michigan, and Clay Township. Harsen's Island, also unceded Anishinaabe territory, is now on the west side of the international border line. The border was redrawn in the 19th century following disputes between the United Kingdom and the United States; their governments were oblivious to the interests and rights of the Indigenous peoples living on and using these lands. As such, the First Nation is now trying to solve their grievances with the Crown with a specific claim.

Walpole Island is known as the resting place of Tecumseh, prominent 19th-century leader of the Native American tribe known as the Shawnee.

History

Settlement (1600s–1800s)
In the late 1600s and early 1700s, what is now known as Walpole Island and the surrounding area was settled by people from the Ojibwe and Odawa nations. In 1844, Jesuits from nearby Sandwich built a mission at the northern point of Walpole Island at the Highbanks. This raised tensions with the Anishinaabeg as the Jesuits were not invited to build on the island and they cut down oak trees that the community did not want to be cut. The relationship between the two groups was further antagonized by the theological debate that Father Pierre Chazelle held with Chief Peterwegeschick and other chief leaders on July 31, 1844. In 1850, the Jesuits left after the mission was razed.

Deforestation of the island (1869–1883)
Due to a number of contracts for harvesting oak on the island, drawn up by non-Native resource industries, a large amount of Walpole Island was deforested. The nature of these contracts "created a lasting mistrust between the community, Indian Affairs, and non-Native resource industries."

Illegal hunting prohibitions (1884–1899)
As part of an effort to colonize the island, Indian Affairs produced an illegal prohibition on the hunting of ducks on St. Anne's Island. The prohibition was lifted once Aboriginal Title was reaffirmed in 1899.

20th-century industrialization of St. Clair River
By the early twentieth century, the river surrounding Walpole Island was heavily trafficked with industrial freight.

Environment 
The island is also home to many different environmental efforts, including the Walpole Island Land Trust and the Purple Martin Project run by Richard Carr. Walpole Island has the only self-sustaining population of northern bobwhite (Colinus virginianus) confirmed to exist in Ontario, and by extension, all of Canada.

Demographics
As of January 2011, the registered population of the Walpole Island First Nation is 4,315 members, of whom 2,213 live on the reserve, 22 live on another reserve, and 2,080 live off reserve.

Transportation
Walpole Island is connected to mainland Canada by the Tecumsah Rd. Bridge (Route 32). The Walpole-Algonac Ferry connects with the US city of Algonac, Michigan. This ferry service has been in place for over 100 years.

Images

Notable people
 Bauzhi-Geezhig-Waeshikum
 Alexander McKee - Indian Department agent who founded the Walpole Island settlement
 Stephen Kiyoshk - murderer executed for killing a fellow tribesman in 1939. Notable for being the only person in Canadian history to be sentenced to death twice for different crimes.

See also 
 List of Jesuit sites
 Walpole–Algonac Ferry

References

Ojibwe reserves in Ontario
Odawa reserves in Ontario
Islands of the St. Clair River
River islands of Ontario
Lake St. Clair
Ontario populated places on Lake St. Clair
Landforms of Lambton County
Potawatomi reserves in Ontario
Unceded territories in Ontario